Morrisons Hill was a small railway station on the Main South railway line in New South Wales, Australia. It was open between 1908 and 1975 and has now been demolished.

References

Disused railway stations in New South Wales
1975 disestablishments in Australia
Railway stations in Australia opened in 1908
Railway stations closed in 1975
Main Southern railway line, New South Wales